Bowflex is the brand name for a series of fitness training equipment, marketed and sold by Nautilus, Inc. Based in Vancouver, Washington, it sells its products through direct, retail and international channels. The first Bowflex product, Bowflex 2000X, was created in 1986. Bowflex products now range from a smart activity tracker to cardio machines, adjustable dumbbells, and home gyms.

History
The Bowflex grew out of a now-expired patent first conceived by an Ethiopian engineering student in the United States, Tessema Dosho Shifferaw. Bowflex of America, Inc. began marketing the first product, Bowflex 2000X in 1986. Instead of conventional weights or pulley machines, the original Bowflex machine used a combination of polymer rods to create constant resistance or tension.

Bowflex of America changed its name to Bowflex, Inc, and became a public company on the Toronto Stock Exchange. In 1999 the company changed its name to Direct Focus, Inc. and initiated an IPO on Nasdaq. With the success of Bowflex, the company bought the Nautilus Corporation, Schwinn Fitness, and Stairmaster. In 2002 the company moved to the NYSE and renamed itself The Nautilus Group and is now Nautilus, Inc.

Recalls
On January 29, 2004, about 420,000 Bowflex machines were recalled due to mechanical problems.  In November 2004, there was a recall of nearly 800,000 (680,000 Power Pro units and 102,000 Ultimate units) Bowflex machines after reports that several models had broken unexpectedly. The Consumer Product Safety Commission said that the seats could unexpectedly break, and that the backboard bench could collapse when in the incline position on the Power Pro model. This recall was voluntary and the company offered every purchaser a free safety repair kit.
In March, 2006, about 17,000 Bowflex Ultimate 2's were recalled due to problems.

In December 2007 about 68,000 home gyms were recalled.

In March 2009, about 78,000 Bowflex Ultimate 2's were recalled due to problems with the horizontal seat rail.

See also
 
 NordicTrack
 Soloflex
 Vacuactivus

External links
Official site

References

American companies established in 1986
Exercise equipment companies
Weight training equipment